Frans Wilhelm (Wilho) Sipilä (7 August 1858, Vahto - 8 March 1917) was a Finnish Lutheran clergyman and politician. He was a member of the Parliament of Finland from 1907 to 1908 and again from 1909 to 1913, representing the Finnish Party.

References

1858 births
1917 deaths
People from Rusko
People from Turku and Pori Province (Grand Duchy of Finland)
20th-century Finnish Lutheran clergy
Finnish Party politicians
Members of the Parliament of Finland (1907–08)
Members of the Parliament of Finland (1909–10)
Members of the Parliament of Finland (1910–11)
Members of the Parliament of Finland (1911–13)
University of Helsinki alumni